Fernando Hernández Ramos (born 11 September 1989) is a Cuban volleyball player, member of the Cuba men's national volleyball team and Greek team, Panathinaikos. Silver medalist at the 2010 World Championship held in Italy.

Sporting achievements

Clubs
 CEV Challenge Cup
  2021/2022 – with Halkbank Ankara (runner-up) 

 National championships
 2017/2018  Turkish Cup, with Halkbank Ankara
 2017/2018  Turkish Championship, with Halkbank Ankara
 2022  Greek Super Cup, with Panathinaikos Athens

Youth national team
 2008  NORCECA U21 Championship
 2009  FIVB U21 World Championship

Individual awards
 2008: NORCECA U21 Championship – Best Server
 2011: NORCECA Championship – Best Server
 2011: Pan American Games – Best Server
 2011: FIVB World Cup – Best Scorer 
 2016: Italian Championship – Best Server
 2017: Italian Cup – Best Scorer
 2020: Turkish Championship – Best Opposite
 2021: Turkish Cup – Best Opposite
2022: Greek Super Cup – Most Valuable Player

External links
 
 Player profile at LegaVolley.it 
 Player profile at Volleybox.net 

1989 births
Living people
Cuban men's volleyball players
Volleyball players at the 2011 Pan American Games
Pan American Games medalists in volleyball
Medalists at the 2011 Pan American Games
Pan American Games silver medalists for Cuba
Cuban expatriate sportspeople in Japan
Expatriate volleyball players in Japan
Cuban expatriate sportspeople in Italy
Expatriate volleyball players in Italy
Cuban expatriate sportspeople in Turkey
Expatriate volleyball players in Turkey
Cuban expatriate sportspeople in Greece
Expatriate volleyball players in Greece
Panathinaikos V.C. players
Opposite hitters
21st-century Cuban people